Iker Camaño Ortuzar (born March 14, 1979 in Santurce-Santurtzi, Spain) is a retired Spanish professional road bicycle racer who last rode for UCI Professional Continental . Camaño followed Basque star Iban Mayo from Euskaltel to Saunier Duval, who subsequently became Fuji-Servetto.

Major results

2008
 3rd Overall Vuelta Chihuahua Internacional
1st Stage 4
2011
 1st Overall Cinturón Ciclista a Mallorca
1st Stage 2
 1st Stage 4 Tour of Norway
2012
 2nd Overall Troféu Joaquim Agostinho
1st Prologue

References

External links

Iker Camaño's profile on Cycling Base

1979 births
Living people
People from Santurtzi
Cyclists from the Basque Country (autonomous community)
Spanish male cyclists
Sportspeople from Biscay